The , signed as Route 6, is one of the tolled routes of the Shuto Expressway system serving the Greater Tokyo Area and is one of five of the routes in the system serving Saitama Prefecture despite not being given a designation to signify this. It is one of two expressways signed as Route 6 in the system; the other expressway signed as Route 6 is the Mukojima Route. Alongside the Mukojima Route, it connects Tokyo's Inner Circular Route in central Tokyo to the Jōban Expressway, which connects the Kantō region to the Tōhoku region.

Route description
The Misato Route begins at Kosuge Junction with the Central Circular Route in Katsushika as an indirect continuation north for the Mukojima Route, the other expressway signed as Route 6 on the Shuto Expressway network. From this southern terminus, it travels northeast out of Katsushika, crossing in to Adachi, Tokyo. The expressway is paralleled by the Ayase River along its route through Tokyo, upon entering Saitama Prefecture, the expressway curves to the northeast away from the river. In Saitama the expressway passes through the city of Yashio before entering the city of Misato where it meets its northern terminus at Misato Junction where it intersects the Tokyo Gaikan Expressway. From there, the expressway continues north as the Jōban Expressway, leaving the Shuto Expressway network.

The speed limit is set at 60 km/h between Kosuge Junction and the interchange at Kahei. The remainder of the route has a speed limit of 80 km/h.

History
The entirety of the Misato Route was opened to traffic on 24 January 1985 instead of being opened in phases like many of the other routes in the Shuto Expressway network.

Junction list

See also

References

External links

6-Misato
1985 establishments in Japan
Roads in Tokyo
Roads in Saitama Prefecture